Notocrambus is a genus of moths of the family Crambidae.

Species
Notocrambus cuprealis (Hampson, 1907)
Notocrambus holomelas Turner, 1922

References

Natural History Museum Lepidoptera genus database

Scopariinae
Crambidae genera
Taxa named by Alfred Jefferis Turner